Resort to Murder is a five-part British television crime drama series, written and created by Tony McHale, first broadcast on BBC1 on 27 July 1995. The series, directed by Bruce MacDonald, follows Joshua Penny (Ben Chaplin), a post-graduate student whose mother, Harriet, is herself murdered after having been the sole eyewitness to another murder. The series is set in and around Brighton.

Resort to Murder was first commissioned as an eight-part series in 1991 under the working title of Brighton Boy, and took over two years for writer Tony McHale to complete. In 1993, then-head of drama at the BBC, Charles Denton, green-lighted the series and awarded it a £4.5 million budget. The series was filmed over the course of 17 weeks from September to December 1993. Several members of the cast were hand-picked by McHale. After shooting completed, producer Barry Hanson arranged a viewing of all eight episodes for executive producer Michael Wearing, and both concluded following the viewing that "the series just didn't work." Then controller of BBC1, Alan Yentob, was later invited to a viewing of a director's cut of the first three episodes, heavily reworked by Wearing and Hanson. Yentob reportedly told them "he did not want such rubbish on his channel".

Director Bruce MacDonald was then sacked from the project by Yentob, and the series was re-worked into five episodes, with writer McHale heavily involved in the editing process. More than eighteen months after completion, the series was finally listed for transmission on 27 July 1995, with episodes airing at 10pm on Thursdays. The series has never been released on VHS or DVD, although a soundtrack to the series was released via Debonair Records on 7 August 1995.

Cast
 Ben Chaplin as Joshua Penny 
 Steven Waddington as Neville 
 Kelly Hunter as Lucy Chapman 
 Peter Firth as Peter Dennigan 
 John Stahl as Inspector Reed 
 Sean Gilder as PC Graham 
 David Daker as Sam Penny 
 Brett Fancy as The Leveller
 Nigel Terry as Kepler 
 Neil Stuke as Skins 
 Robert Pugh as Danny McCrea 
 John Gillett as David Rossler
 Eileen Nicholas as Harriet Penny

Episodes

References

External links

1995 British television series debuts
1995 British television series endings
1990s British drama television series
1990s British crime television series
BBC television dramas
1990s British television miniseries
English-language television shows
Television shows set in Sussex